The Peninsula at St. Johns Center is a condominium in Jacksonville, Florida, United States. It is the fourth tallest tower in Jacksonville at 437 feet. Groundbreaking was in 2006 and was completed in 2008. The Peninsula is located at 1431 Riverplace Boulevard.

See also
 Downtown Jacksonville
 List of tallest buildings in Jacksonville

External links
 Official website

Residential skyscrapers in Jacksonville, Florida
Southbank, Jacksonville
Residential buildings completed in 2008
2008 establishments in Florida